Ayumi Hagiwara (born 1 June 1992) is a Japanese athlete specialising in long-distance running events. She won the bronze medal in the 10,000 metres at the 2014 Asian Games.

Competition record

Personal bests
Outdoor
5000 metres – 15:24.56 (Yamaguchi 2014)
10,000 metres – 31:41.80 (Yamaguchi 2014)
15 kilometres – 49:35 (Matsue 2014)
20 kilometres – 1:06:42 (Matsue 2014)
Half marathon – 1:10:17 (Matsue 2014)

References

1992 births
Living people
Japanese female long-distance runners
Asian Games medalists in athletics (track and field)
Athletes (track and field) at the 2014 Asian Games
Asian Games bronze medalists for Japan
Medalists at the 2014 Asian Games
21st-century Japanese women